Warren Thomas Farrell (born June 26, 1943) is an American political scientist, activist, and author of seven books on men's and women's issues.  He is a leading figure of the Men's Rights Movement.

Farrell initially came to prominence in the 1970s as a supporter of second wave feminism; he served on the New York City Board of the National Organization for Women (NOW). Farrell advocates for "a gender liberation movement", with "both sexes walking a mile in each other’s moccasins".

His books cover history, law, sociology and politics (The Myth of Male Power); couples' communication (Women Can't Hear What Men Don't Say, and Father and Child Reunion); economic and career issues (Why Men Earn More); child psychology and child custody (Father and Child Reunion); and teenage to adult psychology and socialization (Why Men Are The Way They Are, The Liberated Man and Does Feminism Discriminate Against Men). All of his books are related to men's and women's studies, including his March 2018 publication The Boy Crisis.

Early life and education
Farrell was born in 1943. He is the eldest of three children born to an accountant father and housewife mother. He grew up in New Jersey. Farrell attended high school at the American School of The Hague in his Freshman and Sophomore years, then graduated from Midland Park High School in New Jersey in 1961, where he was student body president. He was chosen by the American Legion as his town's (Waldwick's) selection for New Jersey Boys' State.

Farrell received a B.A. from Montclair State University in social sciences in 1965. As a college student, Farrell was a national vice-president of the Student-National Education Association, leading President Lyndon B. Johnson to invite him to the White House Conference on Education.

In 1966 he received an M.A. from the University of California, Los Angeles in political science and in 1974 a Ph.D. in the same discipline from New York University. While completing his Ph.D. at NYU, he served as an assistant to the president of New York University.

University teaching
Farrell has taught university level courses in five disciplines (psychology; women's studies; sociology; political science; gender and parenting issues). These were at the School of Medicine at the University of California, San Diego; the California School of Professional Psychology; in the Department of Women's Studies at San Diego State; at Brooklyn College; Georgetown University; American University, and Rutgers.

Feminist foundation
When the second wave of the women's movement evolved in the late 1960s, Farrell's support of it led the National Organization for Women's New York City chapter to ask him to form a men's group. The response to that group led to his ultimately forming some 300 additional men and women's groups and becoming the only man to be elected three times to the board of directors of the National Organization for Women in N.Y.C. (1971–74). In 1974, Farrell left N.O.W. in N.Y.C. and his teaching at Rutgers when his wife became a White House Fellow and he moved with her to D.C. They subsequently divorced.

During his feminist period, Farrell wrote op-eds for The New York Times and appeared frequently on the Today show and Phil Donahue show, and was featured in People, Parade and the international media. This, and his women and men's groups, one of which had been joined by John Lennon, inspired The Liberated Man. The Liberated Man was written from a feminist perspective, introducing alternative family and work arrangements that could better accommodate working women and encourage care-giving men. The Liberated Man was the beginning of Farrell's development of parallels for men to the female experience: for example, to women's experience as "sex objects", Farrell labeled men's parallel experience as "success objects."

As a speaker, Farrell was known for creating audience participation role-reversal experiences to get both sexes "to walk a mile in the other's moccasins." The most publicized were his "men's beauty contest" and "role-reversal date." In the men's beauty contest, all the men are invited to experience "the beauty contest of everyday life that no woman can escape." In the "role-reversal date" every woman was encouraged to "risk a few of the 150 risks of rejection men typically experience between eye contact and intercourse."

Integrating men's issues into gender issues

In a 1997 interview, Farrell stated: "Everything went well until the mid-seventies when NOW came out against the presumption of joint custody. I couldn't believe the people I thought were pioneers in equality were saying that women should have the first option to have children or not to have children — that children should not have equal rights to their dad."

Why Men Are the Way They Are
Farrell's books each contain personal introductions that describe his perspective on how aspects of public consciousness and his own personal development led to the book. By the mid-1980s, Farrell was writing that both the role-reversal exercises and the women and men's groups allowed him to hear women's increasing anger toward men, and also learn about men's feelings of being misrepresented. He wrote Why Men Are The Way They Are to answer women's questions about men in a way he hoped rang true for the men.

He distinguished between what he believed to be each sex's primary fantasies and primary needs, stating that "both sexes fell in love with members of the other sex who are the least capable of loving: women with men who are successful; men with women who are young and beautiful."
 He asserts that women feel disappointed because, "the qualities it takes to be successful at work are often in tension with the qualities it takes to be successful in love." Similarly he asserts that men feel disappointed because, "a young and beautiful woman ('genetic celebrity') often learns more about receiving, not giving, while older and less-attractive women often learn more about giving and doing for others, which is more compatible with love." Due partially to Oprah Winfrey's support, Why Men Are the Way They Are became his best-selling book.

The Myth of Male Power

In 1993, Farrell wrote The Myth of Male Power, in which he argued that the widespread perception of men having inordinate social and economic power is false, and that men are systematically disadvantaged in many ways. The book became a foundational text of the Men's Rights Movement, and made Farrell one of its leading figures.

The Myth of Male Power was ardently challenged by some academic feminists, whose critique is that men earn more money, and that money is power. Farrell concurs that men earn more money, and that money is one form of power. However, Farrell also adds that "men often feel obligated to earn money someone else spends while they die sooner—and feeling obligated is not power." This perspective was to be more fully developed in Farrell's Why Men Earn More.

In the men's rights movement, The Myth of Male Power is sometimes referred to as "The Bible" and the "red pill". Critics of the book accuse it of promoting misogyny. Susan Faludi argued that Farrell had effectively recanted his original position as part of a generalized backlash against feminism.

Women Can't Hear What Men Don't Say and Father and Child Reunion
The increase in divorces in the 1980s and 1990s turned Farrell's writing toward two issues: the poverty of couples' communication and children's loss of their father in child custody cases.

In Women Can't Hear What Men Don't Say, Farrell asserts that couples often fail to use couples' communication outside of counseling if the person receiving criticism does not know how to make her or himself feel safe. Farrell develops a method called "Cinematic Immersion" to create that safety and overcome what he posits is humans' biological propensity to respond defensively to personal criticism.

To address children's loss of their father in child custody cases, Farrell wrote Father and Child Reunion, a meta-analysis of research about what is the optimal family arrangement for children of divorce. Father and Child Reunion's findings include some 26 ways in which children of divorce do better when three conditions prevail: equally-shared parenting (or joint custody); close parental proximity; and no bad-mouthing. His research for Father and Child Reunion provided the basis for his frequently appearing in the first decade of the 21st Century as an expert witness in child custody cases on the balance between mothers' and fathers' rights needed to create the optimal family arrangement for children of divorce.

Why Men Earn More
By the start of the 21st century, Farrell felt he had re-examined every substantial adult male-female issue except the pay gap (i.e., that men as a group tend to earn more money than women as a group). In Why Men Earn More: The Startling Truth Behind the Pay Gap—and What Women Can Do About It, he documents 25 differences in men and women's work-life choices which, he argues, account for most or all of the pay gap more accurately than did claims of widespread discrimination against women. Farrell writes that men chose to earn more money, while each of women's choices prioritized having a more balanced life. These 25 differences allowed Farrell to offer women 25 ways to higher pay—and accompany each with their possible trade-offs. The trade-offs include working more hours and for more years; taking technical or more hazardous jobs; relocating overseas or traveling overnight. This led to considerable praise for Why Men Earn More as a career book for women.

Some of Farrell's findings in Why Men Earn More include his analysis of census bureau data that never-married women without children earn 13% more than their male counterparts, and that the gender pay gap is largely about married men with children who earn more due to their assuming more workplace obligations.

Themes woven throughout Why Men Earn More are the importance of assessing trade-offs; that "the road to high pay is a toll road;" the "Pay Paradox" (that "pay is about the power we forfeit to get the power of pay"); and, since men earn more, and women have more balanced lives, that men have more to learn from women than women do from men.

Does Feminism Discriminate Against Men?
Farrell's book, Does Feminism Discriminate Against Men?, published in 2008, is a debate book with feminist co-author James P. Sterba. Farrell felt gender studies in universities rarely incorporated the masculine gender except to demonize it. This book was Farrell's attempt to test whether a positive perspective about men would be allowed to be incorporated into universities' gender studies curriculum even if there were a feminist rebuttal. Farrell and Sterba debated 13 topics, from children's and fathers' rights, to the "Boy Crisis."

Critical reception
Early critiques in the New York Times Book Review by Larry McMurtry and John Leonard included disdain for Farrell's use of gender neutral language in The Liberated Man. More recently, conservative and antifeminist Phyllis Schlafly labeled Farrell a "feminist apologist", though praises his research for Father and Child Reunion. Kate Zernike of The Boston Globe refers to Farrell as "the sage of the men's movement", and the description of him as the "Gloria Steinem of men's liberation" by Carol Kleiman of the Chicago Tribune. Esquire ranked Farrell, Thomas Aquinas, and John Stuart Mill as three of history's leading male feminists.

Farrell's collaborations with Ken Wilber, John Gray, and Richard Bolles have introduced his messages to more diverse and receptive audiences.

Personal life

Farrell married Ursula (Ursie), a mathematician and IBM executive, in the 1960s. After 10 years of marriage, in 1976, he and Ursie separated and subsequently divorced. After what Farrell described as "twenty years of adventuresome single-hood", he married Liz Dowling in August 2002. He has two step-daughters. They live in Mill Valley, California.

Farrell backed Hillary Clinton in the 2016 US presidential election.

Other activities

During the 2003 California gubernatorial recall election, Farrell ran as a Democratic candidate, on a platform of fathers' rights, and received 626 votes.
Farrell's current foci are conducting communication workshops, being an expert witness in child custody cases and researching a forthcoming book (working title The Boy Crisis), to be co-authored with John Gray. In 2010–11, he keynoted, along with Deepak Chopra, a world conference on spirituality (the Integral Spiritual Experience), addressing the evolution of love. He was then invited by the Center on World Spirituality to be one of their world leaders. Farrell speaks frequently on boys, men's and gender issues, including doing a keynote in 2016 for UK Male Psychology Conference.

In 2009, a call from the White House requesting Farrell to be an advisor to the White House Council on Women and Girls led to Farrell creating and chairing a commission to create a White House Council on Boys and Men. The multi-partisan commission consists of thirty-five authors and practitioners (e.g., John Gray, Gov. Jennifer Granholm, Michael Gurian, Michael Thompson, Bill Pollack, Leonard Sax) of boys' and men's issues. They have completed a study that defines five components to a "boys' crisis," which was submitted as a proposal for President Obama to create a White House Council on Boys and Men. In April 2015, the coalition went to Iowa to discuss their position with 2016 U.S. presidential candidates.

Farrell appeared in Cassie Jaye's 2016 documentary film about the men's rights movement, The Red Pill.

Bibliography

References

External links

 
 Commission to Create a White House Council on Men and Boys

1943 births
Living people
American civil rights activists
American feminist writers
Activists from New York City
American non-fiction writers
American political scientists
Male critics of feminism
California Democrats
Fathers' rights activists
Feminist critics of feminism
Gender studies academics
Male feminists
Masculists
Montclair State University alumni
National Organization for Women people
New York University alumni
People from Waldwick, New Jersey
University of California, Los Angeles alumni
Writers from New York City
Brooklyn College faculty